Margrave James III of Baden-Hachberg (26 May 1562 – 17 August 1590) was margrave of Baden-Hachberg from 1584 to 1590 and resided at Emmendingen. He converted, in 1590, from Lutheranism to the Roman Catholic confession, causing some political turmoil.

Life 
James was the second son of Margrave Charles II of Baden-Durlach and Anna of Veldenz, daughter of the Count Palatine Rupert of Veldenz.  From 1557, James and his brother Ernest Frederick were educated at the court of their guardian, the Lutheran Duke Louis III "the Pious" of Württemberg.  James was very interested in recent developments in science and studied in Tübingen and Strasbourg.  He then made a Grand Tour to Italy and France.

Regency, 1577-1584 
When his father died in 1577, James was a minor when he inherited the Margraviate of Baden-Hachberg. Thus, the margraviate was taken up by a regency council, consisting of his mother, Anna of Veldenz, Elector Palatine Louis VI (until 1583), Count Palatine Philip Louis of Neuburg and Duke Louis III "the Pious" of Württemberg.

Division of the territory 
James and his eldest brother Ernest Frederick wanted to be sovereign rulers of their own fragment of Baden.  Their father's last will and testament forbade a further division of the margraviate.  However, the testament had not been properly signed and sealed.  According to the three remaining regents, this invalidated the testament, so they allowed a division, thereby fragmenting Baden beyond the existing division into Baden-Baden and Baden-Durlach.  James received the Lordship of Hachberg, with its seat in Emmendingen.  Ernest Frederick received Lower Baden, including the two largest cities, Durlach and Pforzheim.  Their youngest brother George Frederick received Upper Baden, including the Lordships of Rötteln and Badenweiler and the Margraviate of Baden-Sausenburg.

When James's heir died in 1591, Baden-Hachberg fell to Ernest Frederick.  When Ernest Frederick died without a male heir in 1604, his possessions also fell to George Frederick, thereby reuniting Baden-Durlach.

The conversion 
The three brothers followed different paths in their religious development.  All three were raised in the Lutheran faith.  George Frederick converted to Calvinism, James converted to Catholicism, Ernest Frederick remained a Lutheran.

In 1582, the conversion of Gebhard Truchsess von Waldburg, the Archbishop of Cologne to Lutheranism led to a war between Gebhard, who refused to give up his Archdiocese and Duke Ernest of Bavaria, who had been elected as his successor.  Gebhard tried to convert the archdiocese to Lutheranism and allied himself with the beautiful Countess Agnes von Mansfeld-Eisleben.  James fought in this war under the Spanish general Alexander Farnese, Duke of Parma.  He later served under the Catholic Duke Charles III of Lorraine.

In 1582, at the age of 22, Margrave James III of Baden married the 16-year-old Countess Elisabeth of Culemborg-Pallandt.  She was the sole heiress to a very large fortune.  Their marriage was a happy one and produced four children.  However, it lasted only six years.  In 1588, the couple moved from the Hochburg to the smaller Emendingen Castle.  On 1 January 1590, James III gave city rights to the market town of Emmendingen.

During this period of deep religious division, the Margrave closely watched the three Christian camps: the Catholics, Lutherans and Calvinists.  In 1589 and 1590, he commissioned two colloquia, the first in Baden-Baden, the second in Emmendingen, between Lutheran theologicians from Württemberg and Catholics.  In Emmendingen, the Lutheran side was led by Johannes Pappus from Strasbourg, and the Catholic side by James's court chaplain Johannes Zehender.  Afterwards, James converted, like his lead councillor Johann Pistorius had done two years earlier, in the Cistercian monastery Tennenbach on 15 July 1590 to the Roman Catholic faith.  This caused a huge stir in Germany, as he was the first reigning Protestant prince in Germany to convert after the 1555 Peace of Augsburg.  Under the  rule in that treaty, Catholicism was made the state religion of the Margraviate of Baden-Hachberg on 10 August 1590.  Pope Sixtus V had high hopes for the Margrave.

Death 
However, only a week later, the healthy, 28-year-old Margrave James III died unexpectedly.  His body was dissected by two professors of the Medical Faculty of Freiburg — a very rare procedure in the 16th Century.  The precise Latin language of the autopsy report states that the cause of death was poisoning by arsenic (As2O3).  James's will stated that he wished to be buried in Baden-Baden, which was Catholic at the time.  He was, however, buried in the St. Michael church in Pforzheim.  The inscription on his grave does not mention his conversion to Catholicism.

A week after James's death, his widow, Elisabeth of Culemborg-Pallandt, gave birth to a posthumous son and heir Ernest James.  Ernest Frederick illegally took the baby in his care.  The baby died after less than nine months, on 29 May 1591. Baden-Hachberg fell to Ernest Frederick, who converted it back to Lutheranism.  Elisabeth of Culemborg-Pallandt converted to Catholicism after her husband died.  Ernest Frederick then refused to give her the widow seat in Emmendingen, to which she was entitled under James's testament.

The events surrounding James III's death illustrate the increasing polarization in religious matters.  The tensions between the faiths had risen very high, and the hunger for power of the German rulers and princelings was very strong.  In less than 30 years, these tensions would be discharged in a terrible manner during the Thirty Years' War.

Marriage and issue 

James married on 6 September 1584 with Elisabeth of Culemborg-Pallandt (born: 1567; died: 8 May 1620), the daughter of Count Floris I of Pallandt-Culemborg (1537–1598 ).  They had four children:

 Anna (born: 13 June 1585; died: 11 March 1649), married in 1607 with Count Wolrad IV of Waldeck-Eisenberg (born: 7 July 1588; died: 6 October 1640)
 Charles Ernest (born: 21 June 1588; died: 19 September 1588)
 Jakobea (born; 2 June 1589; died: 29 September 1625)
 Ernest James (born: 24 August 1590; died: 29 May 1591)

References 
 Hans-Jürgen Günther: Jacob III., ein vergessener Emmendinger? Reformation und Gegenreformation in unserer Heimat, in: Emmendinger Heimatkalender 1990, p. 50–59
 Hans-Jürgen Günther: Markgraf Jacob III. von Baden und Hachberg (1562–1590). Das Lebensbild des Stadtbegründers von Emmendingen im Wandel der Jahrhunderte, special edition from Badische Heimat 4/1990, Karlsruhe
 Hans-Jürgen Günther: Die Sektion des badischen Markgrafen Jacob III. - Der früheste rechtsmedizinische Fall der Universität Freiburg aus dem Jahr 1590, in: Beiträge zur gerichtlichen Medizin, vol. IL, p. 297–305, Vienna, 1991
 Hans-Jürgen Günther: Die Reformation und ihre Kinder – Vater und Sohn Johannes Pistorius Niddanus - eine Doppelbiographie, in: Niddaer Geschichtsblätter, issue 2, Nidda, 1994
 Hans-Jürgen Günther: Johannes Pistorius Niddanus d.J. - Humanist, Arzt, Historiker, Politiker und Theologe (1546–1608), in: Lebensbilder aus Baden-Württemberg, vol. 19, Stuttgart, 1998, p. 109–145
 Hans-Jürgen Günther: Markgraf Jacob III. von Baden (1562-1590) - Ein konfessioneller Konflikt und sein Opfer, in: Freiburger Diözesanarchiv, third series, vol. 126, 2006
 Hans-Jörg Jenne and Gerhard A. Auer (eds.): Geschichte der Stadt Emmendingen, vol. I: Von den Anfängen bis zum Ende des 18. Jahrhunderts, Emmendingen, 2006, p. 185-278
 
 
 Werner Baumann: Ernst Friedrich von Baden-Durlach. Stuttgart 1962, S. 33-63
 Johann Pistorius (1590): 
 Johann Pistorius: Warhaffte kurtze Beschreibung (von der letzten Krankheit ... des Jacobs Margrafens zu Baden), Mainz, 1590, (online)

Footnotes

External links 
 James III - Colloquium at Emmendingen in 1590
 Johann Pistorius the Younger
 

Margraves of Baden-Hachberg
Margraves of Baden-Durlach
1562 births
1590 deaths
16th-century German people
Converts to Roman Catholicism from Lutheranism